Desmazeria pignattii is a species of plant in the family Poaceae (true grasses). It is endemic to Malta and southeastern Sicily.

References

Pooideae
Flora of Malta